Tristan Marguet (born 3 November 1987) is a road and track cyclist from Switzerland. He competed at the 2010, 2011 and 2013 UCI Track Cycling World Championships. He won the silver medal in the scratch at the 2015 UEC European Track Championships in Grenchen, Switzerland.

Major results

2009
 1st Stage 4 Tour de Berlin
2015
 2nd  Scratch, UEC European Track Championships
 3rd Ronde van Noord-Holland
2018
 1st Stage 2 Tour of Black Sea
 3rd  Scratch, UEC European Track Championships
2019
 1st  Madison, European Games (with Robin Froidevaux)

References

External links

1987 births
Swiss male cyclists
Living people
People from Monthey
Swiss track cyclists
Cyclists at the 2019 European Games
European Games medalists in cycling
European Games gold medalists for Switzerland
Sportspeople from Valais